Eva Birgitta Ohlsson Klamberg (born 20 July 1975) is a Swedish politician who was Minister for European Union Affairs in the Swedish government from 2010 to 2014. She is a member of the Liberals, formerly the Liberal People's Party. Birgitta Ohlsson serves as the National Democratic Institute’s director of political parties.

In June 2017, Ohlsson challenged incumbent party leader Jan Björklund to become the next leader at the congress i November 2017. On 15 september 2017, following results from the 'test election' in Stockholm County, Ohlsson announced she was to relinquish her leadership bid and to leave the political arena by the next general election in 2018.

Early life and education 
Birgitta Ohlsson was born in Linköping, Östergötland County, Sweden. She received her upper secondary (gymnasium) education at Katedralskolan in Linköping between 1991 and 1994. Between 1994 and 1997 she studied political science, international relations and United Nations studies at Stockholm University.

Career 
Between 1997 and 1999 Ohlsson worked as an editorial writer for several liberal newspapers in Sweden, such as Sundsvalls Tidning, Vestmanlands Läns Tidning, Västerbottens-Kuriren and Dagens Nyheter. Between 1999 and 2002 she was chair of the Liberal Youth of Sweden, the youth wing of the Liberal People's Party.

In the 2002 general election Ohlsson was elected a member of the Swedish parliament, representing the Stockholm Municipality constituency. In the parliament she served as a substitute to the Committee on the Labour Market (2002–2006) and the Committee on Foreign Affairs (2002–2004), and as a member of the Committee on Foreign Affairs (2006–2010). In the parliament she was also her party's spokesperson on foreign affairs.

She has also held various voluntary assignments, such as chair of the Association of Liberal Students in Stockholm (1996–1998), deputy chair of Young European Federalists in Sweden (1998), member of the board of the Swedish International Liberal Centre (since 2001), chair of the Swedish Republican Association (2002–2005), deputy chair of the Sweden–Israel Friendship Association in Stockholm (2003–2005), member of the national board of the Liberal People's Party (since 2007) and chair of the Federation of Liberal Women (2007–2010). She is also part of the Elie Wiesel Network of Parliamentarians for the Prevention of Genocide and Mass Atrocities and against Genocide Denial.

On 2 February 2010 Ohlsson was appointed as new Minister for European Union Affairs in the Swedish government, succeeding Cecilia Malmström.

From 2018 until 2019, Ohlsson served on an Independent Commission on Sexual Misconduct, Accountability and Culture Change at Oxfam, co-chaired by Zainab Bangura and Katherine Sierra.

Personal life 
Birgitta Ohlsson is married to Mark Klamberg, a Ph.D. and professor of international law at Stockholm University.

References

External links 

Birgitta Ohlsson at the Swedish government's website 
Birgitta Ohlsson at the Swedish parliament's website 
Birgitta Ohlsson at the Liberal People's Party's website 
Birgitta.nu, personal website and blog 

|-

|-

|-

1975 births
21st-century Swedish women politicians
Living people
Members of the Riksdag 2002–2006
Members of the Riksdag 2006–2010
Members of the Riksdag 2010–2014
Members of the Riksdag 2014–2018
Members of the Riksdag from the Liberals (Sweden)
People from Linköping
Stockholm University alumni
Swedish bloggers
Swedish feminists
Swedish republicans
Swedish women bloggers
Women government ministers of Sweden
Women members of the Riksdag